Genval is a railway station in Genval, Walloon Brabant, Belgium. The station opened in 1889 on the Line 161 (Brussels - Namur).

Architecture 
The railway station has been built by architect G. De Lulle in 1910, as attested by the inscription "Anno 1910" above the main entrance. The architectural style of the station is not Art nouveau but eclectic. The building, made of orange and yellow bricks, consists of a high central building with a low-rise extension on each side. The rear façade of the station presents a porch roof (or glass porch).

Art nouveau decoration 
The Art nouveau decoration of the frontage consists of four beautiful ceramic panels and four sgraffiti, depicting red poppy flowers, plus one sgraffito depicting the "winged wheel", symbol of the railway since the nineteenth century. This "winged wheel" refers to Hermes, god of the travellers.

Train services
The following services currently the serve the station:

Brussels RER services (S8) Brussels - Etterbeek - Ottignies - Louvain-le-Neuve
Brussels RER services (S81) Schaarbeek - Brussels-Luxembourg - Etterbeek - Ottignies (weekdays, peak hours only)

Bus services
The following service(s) serve the station, operated by TEC.

366 (Ixelles - Court-Saint-Etienne)

External links
Belgian Railways website

Railway stations in Belgium
Art Nouveau architecture in Belgium
Railway stations opened in 1889
Art Nouveau railway stations
Railway stations in Walloon Brabant
Rixensart